Lakhanpal is an Indian surname used mainly by Saraswat Brahmins in the North Indian states of Punjab, Himachal Pradesh, and Kashmir.

Notable persons with the surname include:
 Chandravati Lakhanpal, Indian politician
 Rajendra Nath Lakhanpal (1923–2012), Indian paleobotanist
 Raghav Lakhanpal , Member of Parliament, Saharanpur (2014-2019)